The Humboldt big-eared brown bat (Histiotus humboldti) is a species of vesper bat in the family Vespertilionidae. It is found in Colombia and Venezuela.

Sources

Histiotus
Mammals described in 1996
Bats of South America
Mammals of Colombia
Mammals of Venezuela
Taxonomy articles created by Polbot